The head coach of the Warriors is Jim Fetter. Assisting Fetter are Nicolette Franck and Allison Rutledge. The equipment manager is Jim Campbell, and the assistant Athletic Trainer is Amanda Riesterer.

Offseason
June 3, 2009: Two additional prospective student-athletes have signed National Letters of Intent to enroll at WSU this fall and join the Warrior hockey program. Lauren Lovold played with the Mississauga Jr. Chiefs in 2008–09 and Jaclyn Stapleton, a Westbank, British Columbia native, trained at the Pursuit of Excellence Hockey Academy last season.
June 11, 2009: Wayne State University women's hockey student-athlete Lindsay DiPietro has been voted to the 2009 CoSIDA/ESPN The Magazine Academic All-America Women's At-Large University Division Third Team.	
June 24, 2009: Wayne State University head women's hockey coach Jim Fetter has been selected as an assistant coach for Canada's National Women's Under-22 Team in announcement last week by Hockey Canada. Fetter will serve as an assistant to Margot Page, the former head coach at Niagara University. The 2009–10 season marks the second in a row for Jim Fetter with the National Women's Under-22 Team
Chelsea Burnett enters the 2009–10 season as Wayne State's all-time leader in career points (53), goals (13), assists (40), CHA points (24) and CHA assists (19) by a defenseman.

Sept 17: Wayne State has been predicted to finish third in the College Hockey America Preseason Coaches’ Poll, released Sept. 17 by CHA league officials.

Exhibition

Regular season
Oct 3: Wayne State skated to only its second scoreless tie in ten years. Delayne Brian earned her second career shutout and had 37 saves.
January 30: Wayne State University's women's hockey program officially celebrates its 10th Anniversary on January 30–31. At the City Sports Center, the 2009–10 Warriors (8–11–3, 4–4–0 CHA) will host the Syracuse Orange (13–12–1, 4–4–0 CHA) in a College Hockey America series.

Standings

Roster

Schedule

Player stats

Skaters

Goaltenders

Postseason
Lindsey Park has been selected to participate in the Frozen Four Skills Competition to be held on April 4 at Ford Field.

Awards and honors
CHA Defensive Player of the Week, Chelsea Burnett (Week of December 7)
CHA Defensive Player of the Week, Chelsea Burnett (Week of March 1)
CHA Defensive Player of the Week, Jill Szandzik (Week of January 11)
CHA Defensive Player of the Week, Delayne Brian (Week of January 19)
CHA Offensive Player of the Week, Katrina Protopapas (Week of October 19)
CHA Rookie of the Week, Gina Buquet (Week of November 16)
CHA Rookie of the Week, Julie Ingratta (Week of January 18)
CHA Student-Athlete of the Year – Christine Jefferson

Pre-Season All-CHA Team
D — Chelsea Burnett, WSU (tie)

Second Team All-CHA
Veronique Laramee-Paquette, Second Team All-CHA
Jill Szandzik, Second Team All-CHA

CHA All-Rookie Team
Jenaya Townend, D, Wayne State

See also
2009–10 College Hockey America women's ice hockey season

References

External links
 Official site

Wayne State
Wayne State Warriors women's ice hockey seasons